Wangdingdi Subdistrict is one of the 12 subdistricts within Nankai District, Tianjin, China. It is located in the south of Jialing Avenue Subdistrict, west of Xuefu and Shuishanggongyuan Subdistricts, north of Tiyuzhongxin and Huayuan and Subdistricts, and east of New Technology Industrial Park and Xiyingmen Subdistrict. According to the 2010 Chinese Census, Wangdingdi Subdistrict was home to 122,599 inhabitants.

The name Wangdingdi comes from a village by the same name that used to exist within the region.

Geography 
Wangdingdi subdistrict lies on the eastern bank of Chentaizi Paishui River.

History

Administrative divisions 
Below is a table listing all 26 residential communities of Wangdingdi Subdistrict:

Gallery

References 

Township-level divisions of Tianjin
Nankai District, Tianjin